The Indigenous Peoples' Games (Portuguese: Jogos dos Povos Indígenas) are a Brazilian multi-sport event for indigenous peoples, founded in 1996 by the Inter Tribal Council (ITC)  with the support of the Brazilian Ministry of Sports. The first event was held in Goiania, capital of the State of Goias. The chief organiser of the sporting, traditional, cultural and spiritual side of the Games is the indigenous leader, President and founder of the ITC, Marcos Terena. His brother, Carlos Terena, is the Executive organiser of the Games. In total more than 150 Brazilian indigenous groups have participated so far, including the Xavante, Bororo, Pareci and Guarani peoples. Some international delegations from Canada and French Guiana have also taken part in later editions.

This foreign involvement has grown into the World Indigenous Games which will be held in 2015.

Editions

See also
 World Indigenous Games
 North American Indigenous Games

References 

Recurring sporting events established in 1996
Multi-sport events in Brazil
1996 establishments in Brazil
Indigenous sports and games of the Americas